Derhaag Motorsports is a professional sports car racing team. Founded by former driver Jim Derhaag, the team currently competes in the Trans-Am Series. 

The team formerly competed in the Grand-Am Rolex Sports Car Series, using Pontiac engines and chassis from Riley Technologies.  It is sponsored by Preformed Line Products.

Drivers
  Randy Ruhlman
  Ron Fellows
  Justin Bell
  Paul Dallenbach
  Chris Bingham

External links
Official website

Grand American Road Racing Association teams
American auto racing teams